Tiwa's Baggage is a 2017 Nigerian romantic drama film, written and directed by Biodun Stephen. At the 2018 City People Movie Awards, it was nominated for best movie of the year (English), but lost the award to The Wedding Party 2.

Cast 
 Bayray McNwizu
 Kunle Remi
 Ronke Oshodi Oke
 Bolanle Ninalowo

Reception 
Pulse outlined the chemistry, acting, story and soundtrack as reasons why the film was a good watch. Nollywood Reinvented gave it a 3/5 rating, who praised the production quality, interpretation of roles and soundtrack. The chronology of sub-plots was also noted as innovation in Nollywood that should be retained. It concluded its review with a consensus that reads "It’s a very well made, sweet little story about small people and the big decisions that they have to make.". It got a 75% rating from True Nollywood Stories, who described the story as "simple and pure". It summarized its review by stating '"great acting, romance & soothing story rhythm all make Tiwa’s Baggage a handful".

References

External links
 

Nigerian romantic drama films
2017 films